Radio and Television of Slovakia or RTVS is a  nationwide public broadcasting, state-funded organisation in Slovakia. It is headquartered in Bratislava and led by Ľuboš Machaj.

History
The organization in its current form was created in 2011 following a merger of Slovenská televízia (Slovak Television) with Slovenský rozhlas (Slovak Radio). Funding for the combined organisation is obtained through advertising, government payments, and a monthly fee levied on most individuals registered with electricity retailers and most businesses containing three or more employees.

Like its two predecessor organizations, RTVS is a full member of the European Broadcasting Union.

Radio channels
All stations can be tuned into using satellite (Astra 3B), DAB, FM, DVB-T and online streaming.

 Rádio Regina is separated into the three regions of Rádio Regina Bratislava, Rádio Regina Banská Bystrica, and Rádio Regina Košice. 
 Rádio Patria (in Hungarian: Pátria Rádió) broadcasts from 06:00 until 18:00 in the Hungarian language as a service for Slovakia's largest ethnic minority group living predominantly in the southern districts bordering Hungary.

Television channels
There are 4 national television channels.

Current
:1 (Jednotka) is a generalist channel, showing family-oriented television, Slovak movies, children's programming, news and documentaries. Major sporting events on club and international level are also broadcast.
:2 (Dvojka) broadcasts documentaries and nature-oriented shows such as documentary films by David Attenborough. This channel also frequently shows foreign films in the original versions with Slovak subtitles, including many English-language movies. Minor sporting events are broadcast.
:ŠPORT was launched on 20 December 2021. This sports channel broadcasts 24 hours a day, programs such as live broadcasts, sports news, healthy lifestyle magazines and archival materials. With the arrival of the fourth broadcasting circuit, regional sport was given more space, and one of the priorities of the new channel is also the support of education and motivation of all ages for a healthy lifestyle. 
:24 is a news channel, which was launched on 28 February 2022 as a consequence of the emergency situation associated with the 2022 Russian invasion of Ukraine. This channel consists of regular news blocks, supplemented by premieres and reruns of regular news and current affairs programs acquired from the other channels and Rádio Slovensko.

Defunct
:3 (Trojka) was launched on 22 December 2019 and focuses on archive programming, replacing the nightly Noc v Archíve broadcasts on Dvojka and Jednotka. Originally, STV 3 was created to host sporting events during the 2008 Bejing Olympics. It ran until 2011, being active only during major sporting events before being fazed out completely. Before and after being operational, its agenda was split between Jednotka and Dvojka.

News and objectivity
During the term of the General Director Václav Mika (2012–2017), the content and graphics of the news have changed significantly, with minor modifications it is still used today. The title also included the RTVS brand - Správy RTVS. The news broadcasting programmes were initially struggling with very low audience - on December 18, 2012 only with 7.8% share.

Over time, the audience began to grow, and RTVS news has started to appear as the most objective news in TV in public opinion surveys, with exceptions lasting by now. However, after the election of Jaroslav Reznik as General Director in 2017, who was nominated by SNS party, which was in government, the situation in the newsroom has changed. A new head of the news section has been appointed, under whose leadership, according to most of the journalists, the content of the news was being manipulated. The tense atmosphere led to the departure of a dozen journalists in 2018. More and more space in the news was reserved to the SNS party officials, including journeys of Andrej Danko, the party leader, serving till 2020 as Speaker of the parliament, to Russia. The topic of his plagiarism in rigorous work was also not addressed in the main part of the news.

After the parliamentary elections in 2020 and the new government appointed, news too favorable towards the governmental or oppositional parties seem to not appearing anymore, nonetheless some of the content is still being manipulated. For example in the programme Reportéri, reports about plagiarism of several publicly known persons were not aired.

See also
 European Broadcasting Union
 Czechoslovak Television

References

External links

 Radio and television website 

Publicly funded broadcasters
Mass media in Slovakia
European Broadcasting Union members
Radio stations in Slovakia
Radio in Slovakia
Multilingual broadcasters
Television channels and stations established in 2011
Radio stations established in 2011
 
2011 establishments in Slovakia